The National Medal of Honor Museum is a museum that honors United States Armed Forces Medal of Honor recipients, founded and funded by the National Medal of Honor Museum Foundation. The museum is scheduled to open in 2024 in Arlington, Texas, with groundbreaking beginning in March 2022. Previously, the group decided to build the museum in Patriots Point in Mount Pleasant but decided on Arlington later.  

The location was announced on October 4, 2019, concluding a 5-year, nationwide competition that included Denver, New York City, San Diego, and Washington, D.C. It is projected to cost $150 million and open in 2024.

History

Planning 
Initially, the museum was planned for a location in Mount Pleasant, South Carolina. A design for the museum by Moshe Safdie faced much regulatory scrutiny and criticism by the Mount Pleasant Town Council planning committee. In late 2018, the Foundation decided to seek alternate sites for the museum.

In October of 2019, Arlington, Texas, was selected as the location for the National Medal of Honor Museum. The museum is meant to recognize Medal of Honor recipients and include the National Medal of Honor Museum Leadership Institute, an education center aimed at character development for young people.

In January 2020, Rafael Viñoly was selected as chief architect for the museum. The first renderings for the museum were revealed that October.

The Foundation has also worked to place a corresponding National Medal of Honor Monument on the National Mall in Washington, D.C. A bill authorizing the Foundation to construct the monument passed unanimously in the House and Senate; in late 2021, President Joe Biden signed it into law.

Fundraising 

The Foundation has a fundraising goal of nearly $200 million to build the museum in Arlington. The project is funded by private donations. No federal funds will be used to support the construction of the museum or the monument. In March 2021, American businessman and Dallas Cowboys owner Jerry Jones made a $20 million donation to help build the museum.

Construction 

The site for the museum is in Arlington's entertainment district, near the Dallas Cowboys' AT&T Stadium and Texas Rangers' Globe Life Field. On February 1, 2022, the Foundation announced it would break ground on the museum on National Medal of Honor Day 2022 – March 25, 2022.

Foundation 

The National Medal of Honor Museum Foundation is a 501(c)(3) organization organization charged with designing, funding, building and maintaining the museum. Chris Cassidy, former chief astronaut for NASA and a retired U.S. Navy SEAL, is the museum's president and CEO. Charlotte Jones, executive vice president and chief brand officer for the Dallas Cowboys, is chairman of the board for the museum.

Presidents Barack Obama, George W. Bush, Bill Clinton and Jimmy Carter are "Honorary Directors" of the Foundation. In November 2021, Presidents Obama, Bush and Clinton appeared in a public service announcement in support of building the museum.

See also 

 Texas Medal of Honor Memorial
 Texas Legislative Medal of Honor

References 

Proposed museums in the United States
Mount Pleasant, South Carolina
Medal of Honor

External links 

 National Medal of Honor Museum Official Website
 The Congressional Medal of Honor Museum
 Congressional Medal of Honor Society